Something Big is the sixth studio album by American duo Mary Mary. It was released on March 29, 2011 by Columbia Records. Originally set to be released on December 14, 2010 under the title OMG, it was not released until 2011.  Something Big was primarily written by Mary Mary and produced by Warryn Campbell, along with Jazz Nixon, Gerald Haddon and LaMar "Mars" Edwards.

Critical reception

Something Big received generally positive reviews from critics. Andy Kellman of Allmusic praised the title and opening track "Something Big" for being "a raucous stomper" and its follow-up "Something Bigger" which he notes "increases the energy with super-charged marching-band percussion". Andrea Dawn Goforth of Christianity Today also reviewed the album's opening favourably, with its "exciting march-like drum beat and hooky Timbaland-esque male vocal". Goforth also highlighted the "infectious beats, sweet harmonies, and creative arrangements" on the album while Kellman lent praise to the group's "striking harmonies" on the rich folk-soul gospel that is "Homecoming Glory". Likewise, Josh Langhoff of Pop Matters praised the duo's voices, describing them as "wonderful", writing that they "sing clearly and richly, moving from solo lines to well-arranged harmonies" and that "every note seems perfectly calculated to deliver as much pleasure as possible". However, he noted that if there’s any fault in the music on this album, it’s that vocals and production seem overly-planned and non-outlandish throughout" going on to hail the album as "solid" but on the contrary "frustrating", writing that "it hints at an audacity that its lyrics and music never quite deliver". Similarly Kellman reviewed the "album's second half" less positively than the first, writing that its "relatively dry songs lack the edge of the album’s first half" and so it "sags with plaintively strummed acoustic guitars and churning electric guitars". Kevin Hoskins of Jesus Freak Hideout gave a much more favourable review however, rating the album four out of five stars and describing it as being "much better and more diverse than expected". Hoskins listed "Something Big", "Something Bigger", "Walking", "Homecoming Glory", "Catch Me" and "Sitting With Me" - which was described by Langhoff as "a lovely lilting number" - as particular standouts.

Commercial performance
The album debuted at number ten on the US Billboard 200 chart, with first-week sales of 42,000 copies in the United States.

Singles
The lead single, "Walking", was released digitally on December 7, 2010. The song is currently active on the charts, garnering radio play mainly on Urban, Urban Adult Contemporary, Rhythmic, Gospel and Dance radio formats. In the US it had peaked at #3 on the Hot Gospel Songs, #94 on the Billboard Hot 100, #14 on the Hot R&B/Hip-Hop Songs, #5 on the Hot Dance Club Play, and #57 on the Radio Songs. 
The song's video was directed by Luga Podesta, best known for shooting recent pop videos for Travie McCoy, Emily Osment and Hey Monday and premiered in late January. The second single, "Survive" has peaked at #51 on the Hot R&B/Hip-Hop Songs.

Track listing 

Notes
  denotes vocal producer
  denotes co-producer
Sample credits
 "Something Big" contains a sample from "Mama's Pearl", performed by The Jackson 5.
 "It Is Well" contains re-sung lyrics from "It Is Well with My Soul", written by Horatio Spafford & Philip Bliss.
 "Walking" contains replayed elements from "Gypsy Woman", performed by Crystal Waters, and vocals from "Here We Go (Live at the Funhouse)", performed by Run-D.M.C.
 "Survive" contanins replayed bass sample from "Never Can Say Goodbye" performed by The Jackson 5.

Charts

Weekly charts

Year-end charts

Release history

References

2011 albums
Columbia Records albums
Mary Mary albums
Electronica albums by American artists